Sylvia Murphy (September 24, 1931 – February 24, 2021) was a Canadian singer who was popular on radio and television programs on the CBC from 1949 to 1964.

Biography
She was the oldest child of Celia (née Zoddickson) and John Murphy. Her mother was from a Belarusian Jewish family and her father was of Irish Catholic descent, but both were natives of Liverpool, England. They met in Montreal after both emigrated there separately.

Murphy got her start in nightclubs, and then was the featured singer on the radio programs Coca-Cola Refreshment Time and Club O'Connor with Billy O'Connor. She moved to television with a break on Cross-Canada Hit Parade and later became the singer for Jack Kane's Orchestra on the Jack Kane Show, Music Makers and Music '60. She was also a regular performer on the Wayne and Shuster Hour.

She was married to Charles Templeton.  Her children include comic-book artist Ty Templeton; internet entrepreneur Brad Templeton; TV host and director Deborah Burgess; and prominent tax attorney Michael Templeton, a partner at McMillan LLP. She later married William C. Tate, GM of Garrett Manufacturing Limited, a leading aerospace manufacturer.

Murphy died on February 24, 2021, after contracting COVID-19 during the COVID-19 pandemic in Ontario. She was 89.

References

External links 

 Sylvia Murphy YouTube Channel

Canadian women jazz singers
Musicians from Montreal
Musicians from Toronto
1931 births
2021 deaths
Anglophone Quebec people
Deaths from the COVID-19 pandemic in Canada
Canadian people of Belarusian-Jewish descent
Canadian people of Irish descent